Three cutters of the United States Coast Guard have been named Kukui

, a  Manzanita-class buoy tender Originally built for the U.S. Lighthouse Service.
, a  cargo ship commissioned March 1946. ex-USS Colquitt (AK-174)
, a  Juniper-class seagoing buoy tender commissioned in 1998.

United States Coast Guard ship names